Michael Fitzpatrick (born 1950) is a libertarian, British general practitioner (GP) and  author from London, UK. He was a member of the Revolutionary Communist Party. Fitzpatrick is known for writing several books and newspaper articles about controversies in autism, from his perspective as someone who is both a GP and the parent of a son with autism. His book Defeating Autism: A Dangerous Delusion (2008) describes his views on the rising popularity of "biomedical" treatments for autism, as well as the MMR vaccine controversy.

He has held a position as a contrarian on certain scientific issues as he has disputed the health risks of secondhand smoke, and promoted AIDS denialism. In The Truth About the AIDS Panic, Michael Fitzpatrick and Don Milligan falsely claimed that there is "no good evidence that Aids is likely to spread rapidly among heterosexuals in the West".

Fitzpatrick's books have also focused on the pseudoscientific treatments for autism, such as Mark Geier's use of chelation therapy and Lupron as autism treatments, which Fitzpatrick has criticized as "dehumanising and dangerous." He also condemned the use of secretin as an autism treatment in his 2004 book MMR and Autism: What Parents Need to Know, in which he wrote that "the secretin bubble burst" when a randomized controlled trial found that it was ineffective. In an interview with The Guardian, he proposed that special diets are appealing to parents of children with autism because so little is known about the cause or possible treatments for autism, "And then someone else comes along and says your doctor's useless, that they know what caused it, and that you can do something about it".

Fitzpatrick has criticized Neurotribes for generalizing about autistic people, noting that most low-functioning autistics need supervised living and experience challenging behavior.  He also was skeptical that Naoki Higashida, a non-speaking autistic individual, could have written the book The Reason I Jump because of the "scant explanation" of the process Higashida's mother used for helping him write using the character grid and expressed concern that the book "reinforces more myths than it challenges".

Books and chapters 

The Truth about the AIDS Panic (1987) co-authored with Don Milligan. Junius Publications.   
The Tyranny of Health (2001). Routledge.
MMR and Autism: What Parents Need to Know (2004). Routledge.
Defeating Autism: A Dangerous Delusion (2009). Routledge.
"The point is to change it: a short account of the Revolutionary Communist Party", in Waiting For The Revolution: the British Far Left from 1956, edited by Evan Smith and Matthew Worley (2017), pp. 218–237. Manchester University Press.

References 

1950 births
Autism researchers
HIV/AIDS denialism
British medical writers
Living people
The Guardian journalists
English people of Irish descent